Dominic Gerard Christian is a Councilman of the City of London Corporation where he represents the Ward of Lime Street. He is Global Chairman of Aon Reinsurance Solutions and a member of Aon's Global Executive. He is also the Deputy Chairman of Lloyd's of London.

Biography
Christian was educated at St Joseph's College, Ipswich and the University of East Anglia (BA History, 1982). He was awarded an honorary doctorate in civil law from the University of East Anglia in 2015.

Christian started his reinsurance career in 1984 with Lloyd's brokers JK Buckenham in 1984 as International Facultative Broker. He joined Lloyd's broker Greig Fester in 1989 as International Reinsurance Treaty Broker specialising in Retrocession. He was appointed as Director, Grieg Fester Ltd, in 1995. When Greig Fester became part of Benfield Group in May 1997, he continued to lead the Retrocession Broking activities of the Group.

Christian was appointed as Benfield Group International CEO and Benfield Ltd. CEO in 2005. In 2004 he was appointed as Board Director of Benfield Plc, a former constituent of the FTSE 250 Index. The company became part of Aon Corporation, trading as Aon Benfield, in 2008. He has held posts at Aon Benfield including International CEO, co-CEO and Executive Chairman, International and CEO of Aon UK Ltd.

He is currently the Global Chairman of Aon Reinsurance Solutions. He is a member of Aon's Global Executive Committee.

Awards
 HERoes FT List of Top 30 Male Champions of Women in Business – 2017/18, 2018/19

Personal life
Christian is married to Kate, a Canadian, and has two children.

References

Living people
People educated at St Joseph's College, Ipswich
Alumni of the University of East Anglia
Councilmen and Aldermen of the City of London
Year of birth missing (living people)